The yellow-hooded blackbird (Chrysomus icterocephalus) is a species of bird in the family Icteridae. It is found in grassy and brush areas near water in northern South America, and is generally fairly common. It is sexually dimorphic, and the genders resemble the respective genders of the larger yellow-headed blackbird of North America, though the male yellow-hooded blackbird lacks white in the wings.

In 2007, one was found in the Darien Lowlands of Panama. This was a rare vagrant, most likely from Colombia.

References

yellow-hooded blackbird
Birds of Colombia
Birds of Venezuela
Birds of the Guianas
Birds of the Amazon Basin
yellow-hooded blackbird
yellow-hooded blackbird
Birds of Brazil
Taxonomy articles created by Polbot